Archduchess Elisabeth Marie Henriette Stephanie Gisela of Austria (2 September 1883 – 16 March 1963) was the only child of Rudolf, Crown Prince of Austria, and Princess Stéphanie of Belgium. Her father was the son and heir apparent of Emperor Franz Joseph I of Austria, and her mother was a daughter of King Leopold II of Belgium. She was known to her family as "Erzsi", a diminutive of her name in Hungarian. Later nicknamed The Red Archduchess, she was famous for becoming a socialist and a member of the Austrian Social Democratic Party.

Early life
Archduchess Elisabeth, nicknamed 'Erzsi', was born at Schloss Laxenburg on 2 September 1883 to Crown Prince Rudolf and Stéphanie, daughter of King Leopold II of Belgium. She was named after her grandmothers, Empress Elisabeth of Austria and Queen Marie Henriette of Belgium. Erzsi was Franz Joseph's only grandchild through his son.

In 1889, when Erzsi was a little over five years old, her father and Baroness Mary von Vetsera, his mistress, were found dead in what was assumed to be a murder-suicide pact at the Imperial hunting lodge at Mayerling. Her father's death interrupted the dynastic succession within the Austrian imperial family, fractured her grandparents' already tenuous marriage and was a catalyst in Austria-Hungary's gradual destabilization, which culminated in the First World War and the subsequent disintegration of the Habsburg Empire.

After Rudolf's death, Franz Joseph took over guardianship of Erzsi; by his order, she was forbidden to leave Austria with her mother. At a young age she displayed a strong personality, as well as an opposition to the Viennese court.

Her grandmother, the capricious and image obsessed Empress Elisabeth, did not enjoy being identified as a grandmother and was therefore not close to any of her grandchildren. However, after her assassination in 1898, her will specified that outside a large bequest of the sale of her jewels to benefit charities and religious orders, all of her personal property was bequeathed to Erzsi, her namesake and Rudolf's only child. The Empress made no secret of her dislike of her daughter-in-law prior to the scandal, and after the Mayerling incident, blamed Stéphanie's jealous behavior for her son's depression and suicide. The crown princess herself was entirely dependent on the Emperor's charity, therefore the lack of imperial support towards Stéphanie following her husband's death negatively impacted her relationship with her daughter; the parent and child were never close.
 
In 1900, Stéphanie renounced her title of Crown Princess to marry the Protestant Hungarian Count, later Prince Elemér Lónyay von Nagy-Lónya und Vásáros-Namény.  Although Franz Joseph provided her with a dowry and Lónyay eventually converted, Elisabeth broke off all contact with her mother as she disapproved of the marriage, feeling it a betrayal of her father's memory.  Later, following her marriage, Stéphanie retaliated by disinheriting Elisabeth in 1934.

First marriage
Elisabeth was considered a potential bride for several princes in Europe; among them was her cousin Prince Albert, heir presumptive to the throne of Belgium. However, King Leopold II vehemently disapproved of Stéphanie's recent morganatic marriage to Count Elemér Lónyay and thus refused to give Albert his permission. Albert's sister Henriette was horrified at her brother's choice, feeling Elisabeth's background was too unstable for the marriage to be a success.

During a court ball in 1900, Elisabeth met Prince Otto Weriand of Windisch-Graetz (1873–1952), son of Prince Ernst Ferdinand Weriand of Windisch-Graetz (1827–1918) and Princess Kamilla Amalia Caroline Notgera of Oettingen-Oettingen und Oettingen-Spielberg (1845–1888). Ten years her senior, he was below her in rank. Nonetheless she importuned her grandfather to be allowed to marry him. Franz Joseph resisted at first, having intended for Elisabeth to marry the German Crown Prince, but eventually relented. Elisabeth and Prince Otto were related through her grandmother Sissi; they were third cousins two times removed as Otto was third cousin of the late Empress, both descending from Duke Charles Marie of Arenberg. By many accounts it was Elisabeth alone who wanted the marriage, as Otto was already engaged to a Countess von Schönborn and was reportedly dumbfounded when Franz Joseph informed him of his new engagement. Ordered by the Emperor to break his "lesser" engagement to marry his granddaughter, he complied.

In order to avoid future succession issues, the Emperor made the marriage conditional on Elisabeth's renouncing her right to succession, although he allowed her to keep her personal title and style, as well as providing her with a generous dowry. While his family was officially listed in the Habsburg list of families which were allowed to make an equal marriage (Ebenbürtigkeit) with an Imperial family, they still regarded Otto's Mediatized House and the marriage as a mésalliance and wanted the marriage to be treated as morganatic. As it was a case of the Emperor's favorite granddaughter and Otto's family was legally considered equal for dynastic purposes, as were marriages with all other mediatized Princely families, the marriage was officially treated as equal and his family would have grounds for pressing Elisabeth to become empress should the succession become interrupted again.

The couple married at the Hofburg on 23 January 1902. They had three sons: Prince Franz Joseph (1904–1981), Prince Ernst (1905–1952) and Prince Rudolf (1907–1939). Their last child and only daughter, Princess Stephanie (1909–2005), was born at Ploschkowitz.

The marriage, however, was troubled, and led to unwelcome reminders for the Emperor of his son's death, and possible further scandal for the family:

"The Red Archduchess"
Throughout their marriage both Elisabeth and Otto were open in having affairs, most notably the former's liaison with Egon Lerch, an Austrian submarine captain during World War I.

Only after the death of Franz Joseph in 1916 and the end of the monarchy in 1918 did the couple officially separate. In 1921 Elisabeth joined the Social Democratic Party, where she met Leopold Petznek from Bruck an der Leitha, then president of the audit office, at one of the election meetings. A teacher and a committed Social Democratic politician who became president of the Lower Austrian Landtag (state parliament) after the war, Petznek came from a modest background, but was highly cultivated. He was also married; his wife, with whom he had a son, was institutionalized at a psychiatric hospital in Mauer-Ohling, where she died on 9 June 1935.

The lengthy legal process dragged on, and it was not until March 1924 that Elisabeth was able to obtain a judicial separation. A sensational custody battle for their four children ensued.  Originally the court granted Elisabeth custody of the two elder sons, while their younger son and daughter were to live with Otto. She is supposed to have prevented this either by presenting Otto with a house full of armed Socialists when he came to remove them, or else by threatening him with suicide should she have to give them up. In any event, Elisabeth ultimately retained custody of all four children. Elisabeth doted on her children when they were young, but her relationship with them deteriorated as they grew older. Rudolf, in accordance with her socialist views, was reportedly taken out of school and put to work in a factory. Elisabeth and her daughter Stephanie did not have a good relationship; she reportedly stated that she married her first husband based on the fact that her mother did not like him.

Elisabeth moved to the Hütteldorf district of Vienna and bought a villa in 1929, where she lived with Petznek for the next twenty years. She was at his side at Social Democratic marches and meetings, where she was accepted and accorded great respect. Leopold, however, due to his "haughty" character, was not welcome in aristocratic circles. In 1934 her husband and son made a legal motion to place her under a conservatorship on the grounds that she had squandered profits from the sale of the couple's property in numerous donations, made in order to join the Social Democrats.  The motion was later dropped. Although divorce became legal in 1938, when Austria became part of Germany and adopted German law after the Anschluss, Elisabeth was not able to divorce her husband until after the end of the war.

Second marriage
 
In late 1933 Petznek was arrested and imprisoned by the Austrian government until July 1934. In 1944, he was arrested by the Nazis and sent to Dachau concentration camp until the camp was liberated by the Americans in March 1945. After the war he became the first President of the Austrian Federal Court of Audit.  
As Elisabeth renounced her official title of Archduchess to the House of Habsburg at the time of her first marriage, the new Habsburg Laws did not apply to her; she was allowed to stay in Austria and retain her personal possessions. She formally divorced Prince Otto in early 1948, and on 4 May 1948 she and Leopold married in a registry office in Vienna.

When Vienna was occupied by the Red Army, Elisabeth's villa was commandeered and then ransacked by Soviet soldiers. When Hütteldorf became part of the French occupied zone, the villa was occupied by General Bethouart; Elisabeth and Leopold were not allowed to return until 1955, when the Allied occupation ended. By then both were in poor health: Petznek died in July 1956 from a heart attack, while Elisabeth—who was confined to a wheelchair due to gout—bred German Shepherds, but became reclusive until her death in 1963.

Aftermath

On her deathbed, she ordered her staff to close her villa against her two surviving children and call for a police detail to secure her belongings until the Ministry of Education could remove them. Only her daughter was allowed to see her for a few moments, in the presence of her servants. She had willed some 500 heirlooms, owned by the Habsburg Imperial family, to the Republic of Austria. Over the objections of her first husband, who thought they should go to their children, she wanted all art and books to "be put back in their former places", as she did not believe Imperial property should be sold at auction or come into the possession of foreigners; these pieces are in museums in Vienna today.

She died in Vienna, aged 79. According to her wishes, she was buried in an unmarked grave at the Hütteldorfer Friedhof in Vienna with her second husband, close to the house where she spent her last years.

Since 1995, the villa has been in the possession of the international (Buddhist) community Soka Gakkai International.

Honours
 : Dame of the Order of the Starry Cross

Ancestry

See also

 Elisabeth Island (An island in Franz Josef Land, Russia, that was named in her honor).

References

Austrian socialists
Austrian princesses
House of Habsburg
Windisch-Graetz
Austrian people of Belgian descent
People from Laxenburg
1883 births
1963 deaths
Austrian Roman Catholics
Knights of the Order of Saint Stephen of Hungary
Burials in Vienna